CB 200 is the second studio album by Jamaican reggae artist Dillinger. It was released in 1976 via Island Records, making it the musician's first album on the label. Recording sessions took place at Channel One Recording Studios in Kingston. Production of the album was entirely handled by Joseph "Jo Jo" Hoo Kim. The album peaked at number 7 in the Netherlands and spawned a hit single "Cokane in My Brain", which became a number-one single in the Netherlands and also reached number 2 in Belgium and number 35 in Germany.

Critical reception 

Stephen Cook of AllMusic said that the album's sound "is dark-hued and rootsy, full of smoky horns and dubby textures that are well suited to Dillinger's dread delivery".

Track listing 
All tracks composed by Dillinger

Personnel 
 Lester Bullock – vocals, composer
 Wade "Trinity" Brammer – backing vocals
 Earl "Chinna" Smith – guitar
 Radcliffe "Dougie" Bryan – guitar
 Aston Francis Barrett – bass
 Bertram "Ranchie" McLean – bass
 Oswald Hibbert – keyboards, engineering
 Ansel Collins – keyboards
 Errol "Tarzan" Nelson – keyboards
 Sly Dunbar – drums
 Anthony Basil "Benbow" Creary – drums
 Thomas Matthew McCook – saxophone
 Leslie Wint – trumpet
 Vincent Gordon – trombone
 Joseph "Jo Jo" Hoo Kim – producer, engineer

Charts

References

External links 

1976 albums
Island Records albums
Dillinger (musician) albums
Reggae albums by Jamaican artists